Concubine Forming was a noise rock band that were part of the burgeoning punk scene in Buffalo, New York during the early part of the 21st century.

The band was formed in 1999 by singer/guitarist Eric Witz, guitarist Mike Hart, and bassist Ed Lover. Their name was a combination of song titles from two of their influences, Butthole Surfers and the Germs. They soon self-released an EP, Rape. Their abrasive sound and use of a drum machine drew inevitable comparisons to Big Black, much to the chagrin of the band who would never be able to shake the comparisons during the rest of their time together.

Concubine Forming soon signed to Big Neck Records and released a 7" entitled Stiff in 2002. The record was extremely popular in their hometown, and the lead track "Yo Mama" became a concert highlight.

The band's live performances (and Witz's penchant for doing potentially dangerous stunts like backflips while playing guitar, in particular) garnered them a sizable following.

But the band was temporarily halted with the departure of Ed Lover. After a lengthy search, they selected Traci Volker as a replacement. Shortly after, they entered the studio to record their full-length debut, The Guilt Will Kill. The album, produced by members of The Lost Sounds, was released in 2004 on Big Neck. A cover of Billy Squier's "The Stroke" was included as a hidden track.

Concubine Forming then brought former Sera Eclipsed drummer Jason Molina into the fold. The addition of a drummer gave the music a more organic feel. But, Jason accepted an offer to join up and coming recording artists Longwave not long afterwards.

Rather than attempt to recapture the magic with a new drummer, the band decided to call it quits, playing their final show on 25 January 2005. Following the dissolution of Concubine Forming, Mike went on to join The Trailerpark Tornados and The Next Syphilis; Traci joined The Blowtops; and Eric grew a beard, prompting a bizarre in-joke among the Buffalo punk scene, best exemplified by the line "Where did it come from? What's it doing it here? Is it something that I should fear?" from the song "Eric's Beard" by The Next Syphilis.

Musical groups from Buffalo, New York
Rock music groups from New York (state)